Yeh Dil Aashiqanaa is a 2002 Indian (भारतीय)romantic thriller action film directed by Kuku Kohli, with music by Nadeem–Shravan. The film stars Karan Nath and Jividha Sharma. It was one of the most successful films of 2002.

Synopsis
Karan Malhotra and Pooja who are studying in the same college in Pune. They fall in love, and everything seems to be going fine until one day, while visiting her brother in Mumbai, Pooja's flight is hijacked by a group of terrorists, following the arrest of their leader Ashraf-ul-Haq Malik (Vishal Khanna).

The hijacking has been engineered by Pooja's brother Vijay Varma, who is in league with the terrorist head Akhmash Jalal. Vijay is unaware of the fact that his sister is on the flight. When he realizes this, he is unable to do anything as Akhmash forbids him from doing anything to jeopardize their mission.

Karan risks his life and rescues Pooja and the other passengers, getting rid of all the hijackers on the plane in the process, thus inviting the wrath of Akhmash and Vijay. Akhmash then sets out to kill Karan. On the other hand, Vijay puts his foot down when Pooja reveals her intentions of marrying Karan.

Pooja and Karan decide to escape, but they are chased and nabbed by Akhmash and his men and held captive in his den. Akhmash then tries to blackmail the Indian government by demanding the release of his leader Ashraf-ul-Haq Mallik as a ransom for the lives of Karan and Pooja. The Indian government decides to release Ashraf-ul-Haq Mallik to rescue Karan. In the last scene, there is a fight between Karan and the terrorists and all are killed, including Ashraf-ul-Haq Mallik. Karan and Pooja are united.

Cast
Karan Nath as Karan Malhotra 
Jividha Sharma as Pooja Verma 
Rajat Bedi as Vijay Verma, Pooja's brother. 
Aruna Irani as Karan's mother
Johnny Lever as Professor
Vishal Khanna as Ashraf-ul-Haq Malik 
Arun Bakshi as Airport Patrolling Staff
Aditya Pancholi as Akhmash Jalaal

Soundtrack
The soundtrack is composed by the music duo Nadeem-Shravan. Lyrics were written by Sameer. The music became popular, especially the track Allah Allah. According to the Indian trade website Box Office India, with around 16,000,000 units sold, this film's soundtrack album was the year's twelfth highest-selling.

References

External links

2002 films
Films scored by Nadeem–Shravan
Films about aircraft hijackings
Films about aviation accidents or incidents
Films about terrorism in India
Films set on airplanes
2000s Hindi-language films
Indian aviation films
2000s romantic action films
Indian romantic action films
Films directed by Kuku Kohli